The Publicity Building is a historic Class-B commercial office building located at 40-44 Bromfield Street in downtown Boston, Massachusetts.

Description and history 
The nine-story, brick and limestone office building was designed by Arthur H. Bowditch and built in 1916. It is noted for its Beaux Arts styling and its largely intact cast-iron storefronts. Its name is supposedly derived from an early concentration of press and media-related businesses which occupied its upper floors. It underwent renovations in 1975.

The building was listed on the National Register of Historic Places on August 20, 2003.

Gallery

See also 
 National Register of Historic Places listings in northern Boston, Massachusetts

References

Buildings and structures completed in 1916
Commercial buildings on the National Register of Historic Places in Massachusetts
Office buildings in Boston
National Register of Historic Places in Boston

Beaux-Arts architecture in Massachusetts